Robert "Roby" Hentges (born 15 September 1940) is a former Luxembourgian cyclist. He competed in the individual road race at the 1960 Summer Olympics.

References

External links
 

1940 births
Living people
Luxembourgian male cyclists
Olympic cyclists of Luxembourg
Cyclists at the 1960 Summer Olympics
People from Differdange